Nikolaos Andreadakis (1889–1920) was a Greek athlete. He competed in three events at the 1906 Intercalated Games. Andreadakis was killed in action during the Greco-Turkish War.

References

1889 births
1920 deaths
Turkish male athletes
Greek male athletes
Emigrants from the Ottoman Empire to Greece
Date of birth missing
Date of death missing
Place of death missing
Athletes (track and field) at the 1906 Intercalated Games
Greek military personnel of the Greco-Turkish War (1919–1922)
Greek military personnel killed in action
People from the Aegean Region
Olympians killed in warfare